Antonio Cromartie (born April 15, 1984) is an American former professional football player who was a cornerback in the National Football League (NFL). He played college football for the Florida State Seminoles and was selected in the first round by the San Diego Chargers in the 2006 NFL Draft. He was selected to four Pro Bowls and was a first-team All-Pro in 2007 after leading the league in interceptions. He also played for the Arizona Cardinals, New York Jets and Indianapolis Colts. Cromartie holds the record for the longest scoring play in NFL history after returning a missed field goal 109 yards for a touchdown in 2007. After his playing career, he was a cornerback coach for the Texas A&M Aggies.

Early years
Cromartie was born in Tallahassee, Florida, He was a versatile player at Tallahassee's Lincoln High School. Throughout his senior season, Cromartie recorded 12 tackles and 2 interceptions, returned 3 punts and 2 kicks for TDs, had 450 yards and 1 touchdown on 30 catches and ran the ball 13 times for 242 yards and 3 touchdowns. This was enough to earn Cromartie 2002 USA Today defensive player of the year. Considered a four-star recruit by Rivals.com, Cromartie ranked sixth among cornerback prospects in the nation. Cromartie also participated in the 2003 U.S. Army All-American Bowl.

Cromartie also ran track in high school and placed 3rd in the 110-metres hurdles and as a member of the 4 x 100-metres relay team at the Class 5A County track meet. He also cleared 14.3 meters in triple jump.

College career
Cromartie decided to stay close to home for college and accepted an athletic scholarship offer from Florida State University, where he played for coach Bobby Bowden's Florida State Seminoles football team from 2003 to 2004. After flashing playmaking potential as a nickelback and kick returner his first two years, Cromartie tore the anterior cruciate ligament in his left knee in July 2005 during voluntary workouts before his junior year and was forced to miss the entire 2005 season. He was potentially going to play at wide receiver during his junior year.

In addition to football, Cromartie also joined the Florida State Seminoles track team in 2004. He was a member of the FSU track team that won the ACC Championship in 2004, where he placed 10th in the 200 meters with a time of 21.35 seconds. He ran a career-best time of 46.39 seconds in the 400 meters at the NCAA Division I Championships, placing 6th in the prelims. He was timed at 21.27 seconds in the 200 meters.

Professional career

2006 NFL Combine

Despite being removed from competitive football for an entire year, Cromartie was still selected as the 19th overall pick of the first round of the 2006 NFL Draft by the Chargers based on his great potential.

After not performing much at the NFL Scouting Combine, on March 16, 2006, just 8 months after surgery to repair his torn ACL, Cromartie performed at his pro day in 2006 for scouts.

San Diego Chargers

On July 25, 2006, Cromartie signed a 5-year, $13.5 million contract with $7.35 million guaranteed with the Chargers. In his first season with the Chargers, Cromartie saw action at cornerback and on special teams. Toward the end of the season, Cromartie handled some punt and kickoff return duties. In a game against the Oakland Raiders, Cromartie returned a kickoff 91 yards, the longest return for the team since 2001.

Cromartie wore jersey No. 25 his rookie season but switched to No. 31 as a Charger for subsequent years, the reverse of #13, the jersey he wore at Florida State.

On October 28, 2007, Cromartie had two interceptions, returning one 70 yards for a touchdown, and a fumble recovery for another touchdown while leading the Chargers to a 35–10 victory against the Houston Texans. He was subsequently nominated for the AFC Defensive Player of the Week award.

The following week, Cromartie made NFL history. Minnesota Vikings kicker Ryan Longwell came onto the field to attempt a 58-yard field goal to end the first half. The Chargers put Cromartie in the endzone to return the field goal in case of a missed kick. The field goal attempt missed the goalposts and fell toward the back of the endzone. Cromartie intercepted the football, came down with both feet in bounds, two inches from the back of the end zone, and began the return. Cromartie returned the missed field goal 109 yards for a touchdown at The Metrodome, setting a record for the longest play in NFL history. This record can be equaled but never exceeded (barring a rule change); a regulation football field is 100 yards long, the end zones are 10 yards deep, a play ends when the ball crosses the goal line, and all plays are rounded down to the nearest yard. Therefore, according to the current rules of the game, 109 is the theoretical maximum for plays in the NFL.

The next week Cromartie made his first NFL start in place of the injured Quentin Jammer and intercepted three passes thrown by Peyton Manning of the Indianapolis Colts; the last of which was a leaping one-handed interception in front of Colts WR Reggie Wayne. Cromartie called the interception the best play of his short career. He is the first player to intercept Peyton Manning three times in one game during the regular season, and earned Defensive Player of the Week honors for his performance in the game.

On November 24, Cromartie became the starting cornerback, replacing Drayton Florence (who became a free agent at the end of the season). In the AFC Divisional game against the Colts, Cromartie recorded another interception against Peyton Manning, and his defensive efforts during the game (including a forced fumble against Marvin Harrison) helped the Chargers knock off the defending champion Colts.

On December 16, Cromartie set a franchise record by recording his 10th interception of the season, breaking the previous record of 9 interceptions set by Charlie McNeil in 1961. His 10 interceptions led the NFL for number of interceptions in 2007. In addition, Cromartie had 2 post season interceptions.

Cromartie was one of three cornerbacks selected to the 2007 AFC Pro Bowl team, his first selection. At the Pro Bowl, Cromartie intercepted two passes.

Cromartie was not as successful in 2008, his third season. After stating before the season began that he'd like to break the all-time interception record in a season (14), he managed only 2 interceptions for the season. At the end of the season, Cromartie announced that he played the entire season with a broken hip. The injury was sustained in the first week of the season against the Carolina Panthers.

He finished the 2009 regular season with 3 interceptions, 33 tackles, and 10 passes defended.

New York Jets
Cromartie was traded to the New York Jets on March 4, 2010 for a third-round draft pick in the 2011 NFL Draft that turned into a second-round pick based on Cromartie's performance. In his first regular season game with the Jets, Cromartie intercepted an errant throw from Joe Flacco which he returned 66 yards. Cromartie performed well throughout the season. He finished the regular season with 3 interceptions and broke up 18 passes, but he gave up 7 touchdowns. His kickoff return in the wild card round against the Indianapolis Colts helped to set up Nick Folk's game-winning field goal.

The Jets re-signed Cromartie to a four-year, $32 million contract on August 1, 2011. In the home opener against the Dallas Cowboys on September 11, Cromartie gave up two touchdowns to Dez Bryant and Miles Austin but rebounded the following week intercepting two passes by Luke McCown. Cromartie was named the AFC Defensive Player of the Week for his performance against the Jaguars. In Week 3 against the Oakland Raiders, Cromartie committed four errant penalties for 46 total yards. He later fumbled a kickoff return which resulted in a turnover that led to a Raiders go-ahead touchdown. He left the game in the second half and was transported to Eden Medical Center where he was diagnosed with bruised ribs and a pulmonary contusion.

During the 2012 season, after Darrelle Revis went down due to a torn ACL, Cromartie became the #1 cornerback and performed well, finishing the year with 3 interceptions, 13 passes defended, and 30 tackles in all 16 games started. For his efforts, Cromartie was elected to attend the Pro Bowl for the 2nd time of his career.

After the 2013 season, Cromartie was elected to attend the Pro Bowl as a replacement. It was the third election of his career. Cromartie was released by the Jets on March 9, 2014.

Arizona Cardinals
Cromartie signed a one-year, $3.25 million contract with the Arizona Cardinals on March 19, 2014. He made the Pro Bowl that year as well.

Second stint with the Jets
On March 12, 2015, Cromartie signed a four-year, $32 million deal to return to the Jets. On February 22, 2016, the Jets released Cromartie after just one season.

Indianapolis Colts
On August 22, 2016, Cromartie signed a one-year contract with the Indianapolis Colts. On October 4, 2016, after just four games with the team, Cromartie was released.

Retirement
On March 5, 2018, after spending the entire 2017 season out of football, he announced his retirement from football.

NFL career statistics

Coaching career
In 2018 Cromartie worked as an intern for the New York Jets under Todd Bowles. In 2021 he announced that he would be a graduate assistant at  Texas A&M under Jimbo Fisher.

Personal life
He is a cousin of former NFL cornerback Dominique Rodgers-Cromartie and Marcus Cromartie, a former cornerback for the Montreal Alouettes of the Canadian Football League.

Cromartie married Terricka Cason, who starred on E!'s Candy Girls, on July 2, 2008. Cason gave birth to a daughter named Alanna in June 2009  a son in early 2011, twins in 2016, and in August 2017, a daughter. Cromartie has 14 children.

In 2016, he knelt in protest of police brutality and racial oppression during the playing of the national anthem. He was released from the Colts in October. Although the Jets had released him earlier that year prior to his protest, Cromartie has stated his belief is that his release was due to his protesting social injustice and police brutality.

References

External links

 Florida State Seminoles bio
 San Diego Chargers bio
 New York Jets bio
 Arizona Cardinals bio
 Texas A&M Aggies bio

1984 births
Living people
American Conference Pro Bowl players
American football cornerbacks
American football return specialists
American sportspeople of Haitian descent
Arizona Cardinals players
Florida State Seminoles football players
Indianapolis Colts players
San Diego Chargers players
New York Jets players
People from Randolph, New Jersey
Players of American football from Tallahassee, Florida
Texas A&M Aggies football coaches
Unconferenced Pro Bowl players